Lisa Kjær Gjessing (born 4 July 1978) is a Danish parataekwondo practitioner. Gjessing is a four-time world champion and three-time European champion. She competed at the 2020 Summer Paralympics in the –58 kg category, having qualified via World Ranking. She won the gold medal in that event. She was also one of the flag bearers for Denmark during the opening ceremony of the 2020 Summer Paralympics.

Gjessing had her lower left arm amputated in 2012 due to cancer. She is married and has two daughters.

References

External links
 

1978 births
Living people
Danish amputees
Danish female taekwondo practitioners
Taekwondo practitioners at the 2020 Summer Paralympics
Paralympic competitors for Denmark
Paralympic gold medalists for Denmark
Paralympic medalists in taekwondo
Medalists at the 2020 Summer Paralympics
People from Skanderborg Municipality
Sportspeople from the Central Denmark Region
21st-century Danish women